The Little Quilcene River is a river on the Olympic Peninsula in the U.S. state of Washington. It rises in Clallam County, near Mount Townsend of the Olympic Mountains.

Etymology
The name "Quilcene" comes from the Twana word /qʷəʔlsíd/, referring to a tribal group and the name of an aboriginal Twana village and community on Quilcene Bay.

Course
The river flows generally east through the Olympic National Forest. After exiting the higher mountains and the national forest the Little Quilcene River flows east and southeast through rolling terrain. It enters Jefferson County and flows more directly south to Quilcene, where it empties into the northern end of Quilcene Bay, part of Hood Canal.

The Big Quilcene River enters Quilcene Bay less than a mile to the south.

See also
 Big Quilcene River
 List of rivers of Washington
 Quilcene, Washington

References

Rivers of Washington (state)
Rivers of Clallam County, Washington
Rivers of Jefferson County, Washington